Fimbulwinter was a black metal band that was part of the early Norwegian black metal scene. They had formed in Oslo during 1992 and released two demos that year. In 1994 they released their only album, Servants of Sorcery. Featuring a cover of Celtic Frost's "Morbid Tales", which was the first release by newly formed Hot Records.

The band broke up shortly after. Guitarist Shagrath joined Dimmu Borgir and bassist Skoll joined Ulver.

The band is named after Fimbulvetr (or Fimbulvinter), an event in Norse mythology.

Members 
Shagrath (Stian Thoresen) – lead guitar, drums
Necronos (Morten Lunde) – rhythm guitar, vocals
Skoll (Hugh Steven James Mingay) – bass
Orbweaver (Morten Bergseth) – drums

Discography
 1992 – Rehearsal (demo) 	
 1992 – Rehearsal Demo (demo)
 1994 – Servants of Sorcery (album)

References

Musical groups established in 1992
1992 establishments in Norway
Musical groups disestablished in 1994
1994 disestablishments in Norway
Norwegian black metal musical groups
Musical groups from Oslo